The Year's Best Science Fiction: Seventeenth Annual Collection is a science fiction anthology which was compiled by Gardner Dozois and published in 2000. It won the Locus Award for best anthology in 1991.

Contents

Like most of the books in the Year's Best Science Fiction series, the book consists of a "summation" section listing and commenting on developments in and related to science fiction in the previous year (1999), a selection of stories published in that year (each with an introduction by the editor), and a referenced list of honorable mentions from the stories not selected. The stories included in the book are as follows.

David Marusek: "The Wedding Album"
James Patrick Kelly: "1016 to 1"
Robert Reed: "Winemaster"
Alastair Reynolds: "Galactic North"
Eleanor Arnason: "Dapple: A Hwarhath Historical Romance"
Stephen Baxter: "People Came from Earth"
Richard Wadholm: "Green Tea"
Karl Schroeder: "The Dragon of Pripyat"
Chris Lawson: "Written in Blood"
Frederik Pohl: "Hatching the Phoenix"
M. John Harrison: "Suicide Coast"
Sage Walker: "Hunting Mother"
Ben Bova: "Mount Olympus"
Greg Egan: "Border Guards"
Michael Swanwick: "Scherzo with Tyrannosaur"
Robert Silverberg: "A Hero of the Empire"
Paul J. McAuley: "How We Lost the Moon, A True Story by Frank W. Allen"
Charles Sheffield: "Phallicide"
Walter Jon Williams: "Daddy's World"
Kim Stanley Robinson: "A Martian Romance"
Tanith Lee: "The Sky-Green Blues"
Hal Clement: "Exchange Rate"
Geoff Ryman: "Everywhere"
Mike Resnick: "Hothouse Flowers"
Sean Williams: "Evermore"
Robert Grossbach: "Of Scorned Women and Causal Loops"
Kage Baker: "Son Observe the Time"

References

External links 
 Brief descriptions of the stories in all volumes
 Review of the collection at SF Site

2000 anthologies
17
St. Martin's Press books